The Burkett Islands are a group of small islands lying just west of Mount Gleadell in the eastern part of Amundsen Bay, in Enderby Land. They were mapped from air photos taken from an aircraft of the Australian National Antarctic Research Expeditions (ANARE) in 1956. They were named by the Antarctic Names Committee of Australia (ANCA) for G.E.L. Burkett, radio officer at Wilkes Station in 1960.

See also
 Composite Antarctic Gazetteer
 List of Antarctic and sub-Antarctic islands
 List of Antarctic islands south of 60° S
 SCAR
 Territorial claims in Antarctica

References

Islands of Enderby Land